Egil Uno Solsvik (12 April 1916 – 6 October 2005) was a Norwegian wrestler. He was born in Kristiania, and represented the club IF Ørnulf. He competed in Greco-Roman wrestling at the 1948 Summer Olympics in London, where he placed sixth (shared) in his class. He won a bronze medal at the 1938 European championship. He died in California in 2005.

References

External links
 

1916 births
2005 deaths
Sportspeople from Oslo
Wrestlers at the 1948 Summer Olympics
Norwegian male sport wrestlers
Olympic wrestlers of Norway